The second season of Weeds premiered on August 14, 2006, and consisted of 12 episodes.

Plot 
The second season, while comedic, has a darker tone, as Nancy becomes increasingly involved in the more dangerous aspects of the drug world. Ignoring Heylia's advice, Nancy and Conrad start their own small-scale growing operation and eventually rent a suburban "grow-house", where they can grow marijuana indoors using artificial light and hydroponics. Peter tells Nancy that he knows she is a drug dealer, but considers her too small-time to be worth busting, and the two get married as part of a deal to legally protect Nancy from Peter testifying in a court of law. Conrad initially threatens to leave the operation after learning of Peter's occupation, but ultimately relents.

While Nancy's drug activities increase, Celia wins Doug's spot on the town council, due to the incompetence of Dean, who forgets to file Doug's paperwork, thus leaving Doug off the ballot. Celia immediately launches a drug-free campaign across Agrestic, putting up drug-free zone signs and surveillance cameras. Doug and Celia share a strong desire for revenge on Dean, which inspires a brief sexual liaison. Doug and Celia eventually plan to leave their spouses; Celia tells Dean, who demands a divorce, but Doug refuses to leave his wife, Dana, ending their affair.

Silas and Megan's relationship threatens to finish once she leaves for college (she, a very serious student, is going to Princeton). Silas attempts to get her pregnant to prevent this, but instead his success leads to her parents forcing her to have an abortion. Silas and Megan's relationship ends when Silas has a violent confrontation with Megan's father. Andy develops a relationship with an attractive, sexually formidable administrator, Yael Hoffman, at his rabbinical school, but they break up once he tells her he is planning to drop out, due to an incident at the grow house where a dog bites off two of his toes; he thinks this will invalidate his military obligation.

Silas and Shane become more aware of Nancy's illegal activities, although they deal with this in different ways. Shane continues to have problems fitting in at school and his friends begin to ridicule him for his sexual inexperience. To resolve the problem, Andy takes him to a massage parlor to get a "happy ending" hand job. Gaining confidence, Shane joins the debate team to get closer to a classmate, Gretchen, who later becomes his girlfriend. However, he breaks up with her because of an infatuation with Andy's estranged ex-girlfriend, Kat. Silas takes out his frustrations through vandalism, most notably by stealing Celia's drug-free zone signs and cameras to help his mother. Meanwhile, Nancy has received threats from Armenian dealers who have local grow houses and see her as encroaching on their territory. Nancy tells Peter, and he has them all arrested.

Nancy and Conrad's drug business does well as Conrad's strain of plant (which Snoop Dogg dubs "MILFweed" during a chance meeting at a recording studio) is popular with customers, and the two begin to get intimate. Meanwhile, Nancy learns from Peter that the DEA is planning to investigate Heylia; Nancy and Peter's relationship deteriorates when she tips off Heylia about the DEA. Following the incident, Heylia and Conrad pressure Nancy into quitting the business and persuading Peter to stop the DEA's investigation. When Peter comes over for dinner and manhandles Silas, a shocked Nancy calls Conrad and tells him that she doesn't love Peter, but will string him along until the current harvest is done; Peter hears the conversation with wireless surveillance.

The season concludes with a complex series of betrayals, as an enraged Peter demands from Nancy and Conrad all of the cash from a quick sale of their crop. Heylia hires Armenian mobsters to kill Peter, as she believes Peter is planning to kill Conrad after the deal. Nancy and Conrad's buyer, U-Turn, demands the entire crop at gunpoint. Under Heylia's orders, the Armenian mobsters kill Peter and arrive following the murder, expecting the proceeds from the big sale to pay for their hit. When they realize that U-Turn plans to steal the weed, they decide to take the weed instead. Nancy then discover that Silas has stolen the entire batch and will hold it until his mother allows him to join her business. Minutes after hiding the batch in his car trunk, Silas is approached by Celia and a police officer for the theft of the drug-free zone signs and surveillance cameras, because Celia has footage of Silas stealing the last camera. This leaves Nancy at the grow house, in a Mexican standoff with both the gangsters and the mobsters pointing guns at her in a season-ending cliffhanger.

Cast

Main cast 
Mary-Louise Parker as Nancy Botwin (12 episodes)
Elizabeth Perkins as Celia Hodes (12 episodes)
Tonye Patano as Heylia James (11 episodes)
Romany Malco as Conrad Shepherd (12 episodes)
Justin Kirk as Andy Botwin (12 episodes)
Hunter Parrish as Silas Botwin (12 episodes)
Alexander Gould as Shane Botwin (12 episodes)
Kevin Nealon as Doug Wilson (12 episodes)

Special guest stars 
Zooey Deschanel as Kat Wheeler
Martin Donovan as Peter Scottson

Recurring cast 

Indigo as Vaneeta James
Renée Victor as Lupita
Andy Milder as Dean Hodes
Maulik Pancholy as Sanjay Patel
Meital Dohan as Yael Hoffman
Fatso-Fasano as Marvin
Allie Grant as Isabelle Hodes
Shoshannah Stern as Megan Graves
Eden Sher as Gretchen
Daryl Sabara as Tim Scottson
Vincent Laresca as Alejandro
Becky Thyre as Pam Gruber
David Doty as Principal Dodge
Page Kennedy as U-Turn
Jack Stehlin as Captain Roy Till
Remy Auberjonois as Mr. Albin
Sammy Fine as Benj
Bob Rumnock as Mr. Lippman
Eric Cadora as Agent Shuman
Ron Canada as Joseph
Shawn Michael Patrick as Agent Fundis
Arthur Darbinyan as Aram Keshisyan
Robert Allen Mukes as Abumchuk
Kasey Campbell as Shut Up
Cody Klop as No Way
Craig X. Rubin as Craig X
David Bardeen as Director

Episodes

Reception

Reviews 
The second season received critical acclaim from critics. On review aggregator Rotten Tomatoes, the season received a perfect approval rating of 100% based on 15 reviews. The site’s critics consensus reads: “Weeds’ sophomore season elevates the series’ satire to a new high, complemented by a perfected balance between suburban ennui and life-or-death stakes.” On Metacritic, the second season received a 78 out of 100, indicating generally favorable reviews. Eric Goldman of IGN praised the season’s balance between comedy and drama, commenting that Nancy’s story “[adds] an increasing element of danger to the series that meshed surprisingly well with the wackier aspects of the story.” James Donaghy of The Guardian also praised the balance of comedy and drama, writing “Season two takes us into darker territory while still managing to be funny, shocking and occasionally inspiring.” Linda Stasi of the New York Post wrote “Weeds hasn’t dropped a petal or missed even a beat this season,” and praised the comedic performances of Renee Victor as Lupita, and Tonye Patano as Heylia.

Accolades 
The second season received five Primetime Emmy Award nominations; it was nominated twice for Outstanding Single-camera Picture Editing for a Comedy Series, Outstanding Casting for a Comedy Series, Elizabeth Perkins was nominated for Outstanding Supporting Actress in a Comedy Series, and Mary-Louise Parker was nominated for Outstanding Lead Actress in a Comedy Series. The series received four Golden Globe Award nominations, including Best Television Series Musical or Comedy, Parker for Best Actress in a Television Series Musical or Comedy, Perkins for Best Supporting Actress in a Series, and Justin Kirk for Best Supporting Actor in a Series. At the Satellite Awards, Perkins was nominated for Best Actress in a Supporting Role in a Series, and Parker was nominated for Best Actress in a Series, Comedy or Musical. Alexander Gould won a Young Artist Award for his supporting role as Shane Botwin. Romany Malco, playing Conrad, received a nomination for Outstanding Supporting Actor in a Comedy Series at the NAACP Image Awards.

Notes

References

External links 
 
 

 
2006 American television seasons